Matthew "Matt" Grossell (born October 15, 1965) is a Minnesotan politician serving in the Minnesota House of Representatives since 2017. A member of the Republican Party of Minnesota, Grossell represents District 2A in northwestern Minnesota, which includes the city of Bemidji and parts of Beltrami, Clearwater, and Lake of the Woods Counties.

Early life, education, and career
Grossell attended Itasca Community College, graduating with an Associate of Arts, and Hibbing Community College, graduating with a law enforcement certificate. He is a retired Clearwater County sheriff's deputy.

Minnesota House of Representatives
Grossell was elected to the Minnesota House of Representatives in 2016 and has been reelected every two years since. He serves on the Capital Investment, Judiciary Finance and Civil Law and Public Safety Finance and Policy Committees.

Electoral history

Personal life
Grossell is single and has three children. He resides in Clearbrook, Minnesota. In April 2019, Grossell was found drunk in St. Paul, and was arrested for trespassing and disorderly conduct after becoming unruly at a hotel bar near the Capitol. He was accused of threatening security personnel who responded and staff at a nearby hospital. Grossell was again arrested for driving drunk by the Minnesota State Patrol in the early morning hours of February 11, 2023, near his home in Clearwater County. His blood alcohol level was found to be at .15%, almost twice the legal limit for driving.

References

External links

 Official House of Representatives website
 Official campaign website
 

Living people
1960s births
Republican Party members of the Minnesota House of Representatives
21st-century American politicians
People from Clearwater County, Minnesota
People from Itasca County, Minnesota